Maasai (previously spelled Masai) or Maa (autonym: ɔl Maa) is an Eastern Nilotic language spoken in Southern Kenya and Northern Tanzania by the Maasai people, numbering about 800,000. It is closely related to the other Maa varieties: Samburu (or Sampur), the language of the Samburu people of central Kenya, Chamus, spoken south and southeast of Lake Baringo (sometimes regarded as a dialect of Samburu); and Parakuyu of Tanzania. The Maasai, Samburu, il-Chamus and Parakuyu peoples are historically related and all refer to their language as ɔl Maa.  Properly speaking, "Maa" refers to the language and the culture and "Maasai" refers to the people "who speak Maa."

Phonology 
The Maasai variety of ɔl Maa as spoken in southern Kenya and Tanzania has 30 contrasting sounds, which can be represented and alphabetized as follows: a, b, ch (a variant of sh), d, e, ɛ, g, h, i, ɨ, j, k, l, m, n, ny, ŋ, o, ɔ, p, r, rr, s, sh (with variant ch), t, u, ʉ, w, wu (or ww), y, yi (or yy), and the glottal stop ' (or ʔ).

Tone is extremely important to convey the correct meaning.

Consonants 
In the table of consonant phonemes below, phonemes are represented with IPA symbols. When IPA conventions differ from symbols normally used in practical writing, the latter are given in angle brackets.

For some speakers, the voiced stop consonants are not particularly implosive (e.g. IlKeekonyokie Maa), but for others, they are lightly implosive or have a glottalic feature (e.g. Parakuyo Maa). In Arusha Maa,  is typically realized as a voiceless fricative , but in some words, it can be a voiced trill . At least in native Maa words,  and  occur in complementary distribution, with the former occurring directly after consonants and the latter elsewhere.

Vowels 
Like the other Maa languages, Maasai has advanced tongue root vowel harmony. There are nine contrasting vowels, with the vowel  being "neutral" for harmony.

Syntax 
Word order is usually verb–subject–object, but it can vary because tone is the most important indicator of subject versus object. What really determines order in a clause is topicality since order, in the most simple clauses, can be predicted according to the information structure pattern: [Verb – Most.Topical – Less.Topical]. Thus, if the object is highly topical in the discourse (e.g. a first-person pronoun), and the subject is less topical, the object occurs right after the verb and before the subject.

The Maasai language has only two fully grammatical prepositions but can use "relational nouns", along with a most general preposition, to designate specific locative ideas. Noun phrases begin with a demonstrative prefix or a gender-number prefix, followed by a quantifying noun or other head noun. Other modifiers follow the head noun, including possessive phrases.

In Maasai, many morphemes are actually tone patterns. The tone pattern affects the case, voice and aspect of words, as in the example below:

The Maasai language carries three forms of gendered nouns; feminine, masculine, and place. Native speakers of the language attach a gendered prefix to a noun. The meaning of the noun in context then refers to its gender. Nouns place gender as follows:

"Who has come?" would be asked if the gender of the visitor were known. The noun would be preceded by a gendered prefix. If the gender of the visitor were unknown, "it is who that has come?" would be the literal [English translation] question.

Adjectives in Maa serve only to describe the noun, and they change tenses depending on the noun that they describe. 

Pronouns in Maa usually assign gender (male, female, or place); if gender is unknown, the meaning of the noun in context usually refers to a gender. For example, the context of a female might include working in the house, and a male gender would be implied if the action referred to work outside the home. Maasai uses place as a personal pronoun because place can help identify male or female (i.e. an action occurring in the house will almost always be done by a female).

Tone helps to indicate the verb-subject-order agreement.

Present tense in Maasai includes habitual actions, such as “I wake up” or “I cook breakfast”. Past tense refers only to a past action, not to a specific time or place.

Usage
The Maasai have resisted some forms of colonization and Western expansion, and their systems of communication and exchange revolve primarily around trade among themselves. However, some loss of the Maasai language, while not rapid, is happening as a result of close contact with other ethnic groups in East Africa and the rise of Swahili and English as the dominant languages. In Tanzania, former President Nyerere encouraged the adoption of Swahili as an official language to unite the many different ethnic groups in Tanzania, as well as English to compete on a global scale. Although the Maasai language, often referred to as Maa, has survived despite the mass influx of English and Swahili education systems, economic plans, and more, the socioeconomic climate that the Maasai people face in East Africa keeps them, and their language, as an underrepresented minority.

The Maasai way of life is embedded in their language. Specifically, the economic systems of trade that the Maasai rely on in order to maintain their nomadic way of life, relies on the survival of the Maasai language, even in its minority status. With language endangerment, Maasai peoples would continue to be threatened and its cultural integrity threatened. The minority status that the language currently faces has already threatened traditional Maasai practices. Fewer and fewer groups of Maasai continue to be nomadic in the region, choosing to settle instead in close knit communities to keep their language and other aspects of their culture alive.

See also
Kwavi language
Sonjo language, the language of a Bantu enclave in Maasai territory
Yaaku, a people who almost completely abandoned their own language in favor of Maasai
Asa, a people who completely abandoned their own language in favor of Maasai

References

Bibliography

Andrason, A. and Karani, M. 2019. Dative applicative elements in Arusa (Maa) – A canonical approach to the argument-adjunct distinction. Stellenbosch Papers in Linguistics Plus. Vol. 58, 177-204. .
Andrason, A. and Karani, M. 2017. The perfective form in Arusa – A cognitive-grammaticalization model. Asian and African Studies, 26:1, pp. 69-101.
Andrason, A. and Karani, M. 2017. Radial Categories in Syntax: Non-Resumptive Left Dislocation in Arusa. Studia Linguistica Universitatis Iagellonicae Cracoviensis, 134(2), pp. 205-218. https://doi.org/10.4467/20834624sl.17.014.7088.
Karani, M. Kotikash, L. and Sentero, P. 2014. A Unified Standard Orthography for Maa Languages, Kenya and Tanzania: Arusa, Ilchamus, Maasai/Kisongo, Parakuyu, Samburu, Monograph series No. 257. Cape Town, CASAS.
Karani, M. (2018) "Syntactic categories and the verb-argument complex in Parakuyo Maasai". PhD Thesis, Stellenbosch University.
Mol, Frans (1995) Lessons in Maa: a grammar of Maasai language. Lemek: Maasai Center.
Mol, Frans (1996) Maasai dictionary: language & culture (Maasai Centre Lemek). Narok: Mill Hill Missionary.
Tucker, Archibald N. & Mpaayei, J. Tompo Ole (1955) A Maasai grammar with vocabulary. London/New York/Toronto: Longmans, Green & Co.
Vossen, Rainer (1982) The Eastern Nilotes. Linguistic and historical reconstructions (Kölner Beiträge zur Afrikanistik 9). Berlin: Dietrich Reimer.

External links
Maa language project
Doris L. Payne & Leonard Ole-Kotikash: English-Maasai and Maasai-English dictionary

Languages of Tanzania
Languages of Kenya
Maa languages
Maasai
Verb–subject–object languages
Tonal languages
Vowel-harmony languages